Milan Township is a civil township of Monroe County in the U.S. state of Michigan. The population was 1,601 at the 2010 census.  The township was organized in 1836.  The city of Milan borders the township on the north, but the two are administrated autonomously since Milan incorporated as a city in 1967.

Communities
Originally known as East Milan, a post office was established in the community on August 4, 1869.
The community, originally known as West Milan, was established in the 1830s and had its own post office from August 4, 1869 until September 15, 1917.

Geography

Demographics
As of the census of 2000, there were 1,670 people, 610 households, and 489 families residing in the township. There were 632 housing units at an average density of 18.0 per square mile (7.0/km2). The racial makeup of the township was 98.20% White, 0.36% African American, 0.36% Native American, 0.06% Asian, 0.36% from other races, and 0.66% from two or more races. Hispanic or Latino of any race were 1.74% of the population.

There were 610 households, out of which 32.3% had children under the age of 18 living with them, 70.5% were married couples living together, 6.7% had a female householder with no husband present, and 19.7% were non-families. 16.4% of all households were made up of individuals, and 6.2% had someone living alone who was 65 years of age or older.  The average household size was 2.74 and the average family size was 3.08.

In the township the population was spread out, with 25.0% under the age of 18, 5.9% from 18 to 24, 32.0% from 25 to 44, 25.6% from 45 to 64, and 11.6% who were 65 years of age or older.  The median age was 38 years. For every 100 females, there were 110.1 males.  For every 100 females age 18 and over, there were 103.7 males.

The median income for a household in the township was $57,361, and the median income for a family was $66,875. Males had a median income of $43,696 versus $33,667 for females. The per capita income for the township was $23,269.  About 2.2% of families and 4.5% of the population were below the poverty line, including 5.3% of those under age 18 and 3.9% of those age 65 or over.

Highways

References

Notes

Sources

Townships in Monroe County, Michigan
Townships in Michigan
Populated places established in 1836
1836 establishments in Michigan Territory